Four Stiffs and a Trombone is a Canadian crime comedy film, directed by Roger Cantin and released in 1991. The film stars Germain Houde as Augustin Marleau, a nighttime security guard at a film studio who entertains fantasies of being a film noir detective, and becomes involved in a murder investigation when a killer begins murdering employees of the studio.

The cast also includes Marc Labrèche, Raymond Bouchard, Normand Lévesque, Gildor Roy, France Castel and Paule Baillargeon.

A sequel film, The Revenge of the Woman in Black (La vengeance de la femme en noir), was released in 1997.

References

External links
 

1991 films
Canadian crime comedy films
Films shot in Montreal
Films set in Montreal
1990s crime comedy films
1990s French-language films
French-language Canadian films
1990s Canadian films